The russet-winged schiffornis (Schiffornis stenorhyncha) is a species of Neotropical bird.

Distribution and habitat
It is found from Panama to northern Colombia and northern Venezuela.  Its natural habitats are subtropical or tropical moist lowland forests and subtropical or tropical moist montane forests.

Description
It is medium-sized, about 24 cm (9 in.) long.

Taxonomy
The russet-winged schiffornis has traditionally been placed in the manakin family, but evidence strongly suggest it is better placed in Tityridae, where it is now placed by the South American Classification Committee.

The species was split by the AOU in 2013 from the species complex Thrush-like Schiffornis.

References

russet-winged schiffornis
Birds of Panama
Birds of Colombia
Birds of Venezuela
russet-winged schiffornis
russet-winged schiffornis
russet-winged schiffornis